This is a list of rulers of the Protectorate of Bohemia and Moravia, which from 15 March 1939 until 5 May 1945 comprised the German-occupied parts of Czechoslovakia. It includes both the representatives of the recognized Czech authorities as well as the German Reichsprotektoren ("Reich protectors") and the Staatsminister ("State Minister"), who held the real executive power.

Government of the Protectorate
Note: State President (Státní prezident / Staatspräsident) Emil Hácha and Prime Minister (Předseda vlády / Premierminister) Rudolf Beran held the office prior the German occupation, during the Second Czechoslovak Republic, and were officially confirmed in those positions (with very limited sovereignty and power) by German authorities within few days after the occupation.

State President of Bohemia and Moravia

Prime Ministers of Bohemia and Moravia

German representatives

Supreme Commander of the Wehrmacht in Bohemia and Moravia

Reich Protectors of Bohemia and Moravia

State Minister for Bohemia and Moravia
On 20 August 1943, at the eve of Wilhelm Frick's appointment, the State Ministry for Bohemia and Moravia was created within the Hitler cabinet, which assumed many powers of the Prime Minister and of the Reich Protector. SS-Obergruppenführer Karl Hermann Frank, Higher SS and Police Leader (Höherer SS-und Polizeiführer, HSSPF, HSS-PF, HSSuPF) in Bohemia and Moravia and the former Secretary of State in the Office of Reich Protector since 1939, was the only State Minister (with the title Staatsminister im Range eines Reichsministers) for Bohemia and Moravia, reducing the formerly important position of Reich Protector to a ceremonial role.

Governmental Standards

See also
List of presidents of Czechoslovakia
List of prime ministers of Czechoslovakia

Notes

References

.
 01
Protectorate of Bohemia and Moravia
Bohemia and Moravia, Rulers
Bohemia and Moravia Protectorate
1930s in Czechoslovakia
1940s in Czechoslovakia